Sangamner is a city and a municipal council located in the Ahmednagar District of Maharashtra state in India.

It derives its name from the site of the sangam (confluence) of three rivers in the area: Pravara, Mhalungi, and Adhala.

It is one of the most developed and big city in nearby area and is famous for its markets as it has a number of factories running in the city. The city has a number of industries and has become an industrial hub also in recent years. These industries include a cloth industry, sugar factory, and a tobacco factories.Its market is famous for clothes, jewellery and even electronics. The city is also a huge hub for milk-processing units and has one of the district's biggest marketplaces.

Sangamner has become an educational centre with so many colleges and schools. Most of the colleges are affiliated to Pune University and has numerous libraries in the city itself. The city boasts good school education and has amazing facilities for higher education in law, medicine, engineering, pharmaceuticals, dentistry, etc.

The city enjoys central location (at the centre of Mumbai, Pune, nashik & Aurangabad) & is only 2hrs from Nashik, 3 hrs from pune & 4 hrs from Mumbai.

Geography
It has an average elevation of from mean sea level. Sangamner is the biggest settlement on NH 50 (New NH-60) between Pune (143 km distance) and Nashik (69 km distance). It is about 230 km from financial capital of India, Mumbai. On 15 August 2014, newly constructed by-pass was opened for traffic (9.5 km) which saves about 30.0 min of commute time. In recent years, the city outskirts has been developed tremendously. Kalsubai, the highest peak in Maharashtra is 68 km from Sangamner. It is the most developed city, largest market place (bazarpeth) in district after Ahemadnagar city.

Demographics
 India census, Sangamner had a population of 65,804. Males constituted 51% of the population and females 49%. Sangamner has an average literacy rate of 90.86%, higher than the state average of 82.34%: male literacy is 94%, and female literacy is 87%.

Sangamner Airport
Sangamner city has an airport which is knows as SAG Airport (Shirdi International Airport). It is serving the shirdi and sangamner city which is located 23 km from sangamner city. Airport have direct flights to New Delhi, Bengaluru, Chennai, Hyderabad, Ahemdabad, Tirupati, etc. (of IndiGo and SpiceJet Airlines)

History
The Battle of Sangamner was fought between the Mughal Empire and Maratha Empire in 1679. This was the last battle in which the Maratha King Shivaji fought. The Mughals had ambushed Shivaji with a large force when he was returning from the sack of Jalna. The Marathas engaged in battle with the Mughals for three days but lost to the Mughals.[1]

Shivaji successfully escaped with 500 soldiers while the combat continued until Maratha general, Sidhoji Nimbalkar was killed along with 2000 soldiers whereas Santaji Ghorpade finally took to flight after being routed, with Hambir Rao injured and many Maratha soldiers arrested. Shivaji returned to Raigad safely early in December that year.

References

External links
 Sangamner municipal Council

Talukas in Maharashtra
Cities and towns in Ahmednagar district